Sri Lanka is one of over one-hundred countries which have submitted films for the Academy Award for Best International Feature Film. The Academy Award for Best Foreign Language Film is handed out annually by the United States Academy of Motion Picture Arts and Sciences to a feature-length motion picture produced outside the United States that contains primarily non-English dialogue.

Though Sri Lanka has a relatively prolific film industry, they have only entered the Foreign Oscar competition twice.

Submissions
The Academy of Motion Picture Arts and Sciences has invited the film industries of various countries to submit their best film for the Academy Award for Best Foreign Language Film since 1956. The Foreign Language Film Award Committee oversees the process and reviews all the submitted films. Following this, they vote via secret ballot to determine the five nominees for the award. Below is a list of the films that have been submitted by Sri Lanka for review by the Academy for the award by year and the respective Academy Awards ceremony.

Sri Lanka's initial Oscar submission, Mansion by the Lake, is a Sinhala language drama, loosely based on Anton Chekhov's play The Cherry Orchard. The plot revolves around a Sri Lankan noble family, now penniless, who return to their traditional family manse in Sri Lanka after years in England. Six years later, the country entered The Road from Elephant Pass, a thriller based on an acclaimed Sri Lankan novel by Nihal De Silva. The film is a thriller about a Sri Lankan military officer and a female LTTE rebel captive who are forced to work together during an escape through the jungle. Sri Lanka has not submitted a film since 2009.

See also

List of Academy Award winners and nominees for Best International Feature Film
List of Academy Award-winning foreign language films
Cinema of Sri Lanka

Notes

References

External links
The Official Academy Awards Database
The Motion Picture Credits Database
IMDb Academy Awards Page

Best Foreign Language Film Academy Award submissions by country
Academy Award